Franklin Township is one of eleven townships in Randolph County, Indiana. As of the 2010 census, its population was 1,265 and it contained 576 housing units.

History
Franklin Township was established in 1859.

Geography

Cities and towns
 Ridgeville

References

External links

Townships in Randolph County, Indiana
Townships in Indiana